The 2018 World Mountain Running Championships was the 34th edition of the global mountain running competition, World Mountain Running Championships, organised by the World Mountain Running Association and was held in Canillo, Andorra on 16 September 2018.

Results

References

External links
 World Mountain Running Association official web site

World Mountain Running Championships
World Long Distance Mountain Running